Three of the flying aces of World War I were ethnic Serbs or born in the territory of the modern-day Serbian Republic. They were:

 Petar Marinovich, who scored 21 victories while flying for France's Aéronautique Militaire.
 Johann Lasi, who scored 5 victories while flying for the Austro-Hungarian Luftfahrtruppen.
Raoul Stojsavljevic, a 10 victory Luftfahrtruppen ace, was an ethnic Serbian born in Innsbruck, Austria

See also
 List of World War I flying aces
 List of World War I aces credited with 20 or more victories
 List of World War I aces credited with 10 victories
 List of World War I aces credited with 5 victories
 List of World War I flying aces from Austria-Hungary

References

Further reading
 Austro-Hungarian Aces of World War 1. Christopher Chant. Osprey Publishing, 2002. , .

Serbian
World War I flying aces
Serbian aviators
Military history of Serbia